Lang's worm lizard (Chirindia langi) is a species of amphisbaenian in the family Amphisbaenidae. The species is native to Southern Africa. There are two recognized subspecies.

Etymology
The specific name, langi, is in honor of German taxidermist Herbert Lang.

Geographic range
C. langi is found in Mozambique, South Africa, and Zimbabwe.

Habitat

Description
It is slender, and its coloration is uniformly pink.

Reproduction
C. langi is oviparous.

Subspecies
Two subspecies are recognized as being valid, including the nominotypical subspecies.
Chirindia langi langi 
Chirindia langi occidentalis

References

Further reading
Broadley DG, Gans C (1978). "Southern forms of Chirindia (Amphisbaenia, Reptilia)". Annals of Carnegie Museum 47: 29–51. (Chirindia langi, pp. 46, 48 + Figures 4–8).
FitzSimons VFM (1939). "Descriptions of some new species and subspecies of lizards from South Africa". Annals of the Transvaal Museum 20 (1): 5–16. (Chirindia langi, new species).
Jacobsen NHG (1984). "A new subspecies of Chirindia langi (Reptilia: Amphisbaenia) from southern Africa, with notes on the ecology of the species". Annals of the Transvaal Museum 33 (26): 391–398. (Chirindia langi occidentalis, new subspecies).

Chirindia
Reptiles described in 1939
Taxa named by Vivian Frederick Maynard FitzSimons